Moi Teaching and Referral Hospital was started in 1916 with a bed capacity of 60 to cater for the Africans Health Needs. It later served as a District Hospital before attaining referral status vide Legal Notice No. 98 of 12 June 1998 of the State Corporations Act (Cap 446). Currently, the Hospital serves as a level six Hospital offering outpatient, inpatient, and specialized healthcare services. It is located along Nandi Road in Eldoret Town, Uasin Gishu County (310 Kilometers Northwest of Nairobi). The Hospital serves residents of Western Kenya, parts of Eastern Uganda and Southern Sudan with a population of approximately 24 Million.

The Hospital incorporates the Academic Model Providing Access to Healthcare, which is the most comprehensive HIV/Aids programme in sub-Saharan Africa with presence in 22 satellite sites across Western Kenya and over 150,000 patients put under Anti-retrovirals. The Hospital also runs the Centre for Assault Recovery – Eldoret that caters for gender-based and victims of sexual violence.

MTRH partners with Moi University College of Health Sciences and Regional Blood Transfusion Centre. It has also forged Strategic Partnerships and Alliances with the Ministry of Health; Development Partners e.g. Indiana University and Duke, University of Toronto, Suez Canal University; Shoe4Africa Foundation, New York; University of Linkoping; Doctor to Doctor Foundation (Amsterdam).

The hospital governs the Shoe4Africa Children's Hospital, a 200-bed fully serviced paediatric teaching hospital that is built within its grounds and is the only public children's hospital in East Africa. The Shoe4Africa Children's Hospital was opened in 2015, and in 2022, celebrated treating its millionth patient.

It operates a Training School offering a range of courses including; Higher Diploma programmes in Critical Care Nursing, Nephrology Nursing, Peri-operative Nursing, Oncology Nursing, Clinical Medicine and Surgery, Child Health and Pediatrics’, Mental Health and Psychiatry, Medical Oncology and Chronic Diseases Management. The School also offers Diploma courses in Kenya Registered Nursing, Kenya Registered Community Health Nursing (in-service), Orthopedics Trauma Technology, Health Records and Information Technology. The Training also offers Certificate in Mortician Services and Anesthetic Assistant Services as well as proficiency in Basic Life Support.  The Training School also offers Postgraduate Diploma in Clinical Pharmacy.

As a level six Hospital it offers a range of services to clients including; Oncology services, Renal Medicine, Paediatric, Renal Services, Paediatric Surgery, Kidney Transplants, Alcohol and Rehabilitative, Spinal and Neurosurgical operations, Specialized Orthopedics and Trauma, Cardiology, Paediatric and free Maternity Services among others.

See also

Healthcare in Kenya

References

Hospitals in Kenya